MTV Sound Trippin is a youth-based popular music television show on MTV India.
The show is part of MTV's strategy to focus more on original music.

Format
The show follows Hindi film music director Sneha Khanwalkar, who travels to ten cities across the country to record unusual sounds and make ten songs, one for each place she visits, that capture the spirit of the places. Talking about the show she says "The show’s concept is such that we had to record songs in four days," She only takes a backpack, recorder, laptop and a small crew with her as she travels to areas such as Leh; Majuli, Assam; Yellapura, Karnataka; Dharavi, Mumbai; Kila Raipur, Punjab, Kolkata and Goa.
The other element, which adds to the richness of the show, is showcasing of art forms like dance and theatre by the locals. She then uses stunning visuals and authentic sounds from her travels to create a brand new track. Many of the local artists who record for the show " have never before recorded in a studio.”

Reception
The show was well received. Amitava Sanyal of Hindustan Times called the show a "remarkable experiment". Sneha Mahadevan of DNA said that "The shoots, crisp edits, refreshingly new visuals take this show to a new level altogether.". Meera Gopal of Abu Dhabi based newspaper, The National wrote that "It is the music of serendipity; the kind that cannot be composed in a recording studio or effortlessly crooned to rouse an auditorium to its feet."

References

External links

Indian reality television series
MTV (Indian TV channel) original programming
Indian music television series
2012 Indian television series debuts